State Highway 342 (SH 342)  is a  state highway in the U.S. state of Texas.  The highway begins at a junction with U.S. Highway 77 (US 77) in Red Oak and heads north through Lancaster to a junction with Loop 12 (Loop 12) in Dallas.

History
SH 342 was designated on November 24, 1941 over a former alignment of US 77 from the current alignment of US 77 in Red Oak to Spur 260 (Commerce Street) in Dallas, as US 77 was rerouted over SH 197. On June 25, 1991, the northern terminus was changed to I-30 with the removal of the portion north of I-30 from the State Highway System and returned to the city of Dallas.  On August 25, 1992, the highway was further truncated to Loop 12. The section from I-30 to Corinth Street in Dallas was removed from the State Highway System and returned to the city of Dallas.  The section from Downtown Dallas to Loop 12 was redesignated as a principal arterial street known as Lancaster Road, Corinth Street Road, Corinth Street Viaduct, then finally as Industrial Boulevard at its terminus.

Route description
SH 342 begins  at a junction with US 77 in Red Oak.  It heads north from this junction to two other intersections in Red Oak, FM 2377 (locally known as Louise Ritter Boulevard) and FM 664 (locally known as Ovilla Road).  Heading towards the north, the highway continues to an intersection with Interstate 20 in Dallas.  SH 342 reaches its northern terminus at Loop 12 in Dallas.

Major junctions

References

342
Transportation in Ellis County, Texas
Transportation in Dallas County, Texas